Jami Floyd (born September 10, 1964) is an American attorney, journalist, network news anchor, legal and political analyst, and former White House Fellow.  She is the former Legal Analyst at Al Jazeera America and the former Legal Editor and host of "All Things Considered" at WNYC Radio.

Early life and education
Floyd was born September 10, 1964, and raised in New York City.  Her father formerly worked as a chief architect for restaurateur Warner LeRoy and was also keen in arts and decorating.  Floyd is African American, born to a black father and a white mother. Her family lived in Mitchell-Lama housing on the Lower East Side.

While at Binghamton University as an undergraduate, Floyd worked as a disc jockey at WHRW.  Floyd graduated in 1986 with a B.A. in political science and a concentration in Journalism. In 1989, she attended and graduated with honors from the UC Berkeley School of Law, University of California, Berkeley, where she had been an associate editor of the law review. She received a Master of Laws degree in 1995 from Stanford Law School, Stanford University, where she also worked as a teaching fellow.

Career

Law
Floyd began working as an attorney in the California Supreme Court as a law clerk to Associate Justice Allen E. Broussard.

She began practice in civil and criminal law when she entered the law firm Morrison & Foerster. She left the firm in 1993 to join the San Francisco Public Defender office, where she worked as a trial attorney.

White House Fellow
Later that year, Floyd was selected to serve in the Clinton Administration as a White House Fellow and moved to Washington, D.C. She was assigned first to the office of First Lady Hillary Clinton, where she assisted in the Clinton Administration's effort to pass comprehensive Health Care legislation, and later to the staff of Vice President Al Gore, where she worked on the Brady Handgun Violence Prevention Act, the Violent Crime Control and Law Enforcement Act, and various other domestic policy initiatives. She also helped to vet judicial nominees and worked as a speech writer for the Vice President.

Television
Floyd's first television broadcasting job was as a reporter and legal analyst for KPIX Radio and TV in San Francisco. She spent much of her time in Los Angeles covering the murder trial of O. J. Simpson and the nationwide response to his acquittal. In 1995, she briefly joined CBS News as a legal analyst before moving to New York City to help launch the cable outlet Court TV as an anchor and correspondent.

In 1997, she joined ABC News, where she worked as a news correspondent for World News Tonight with Peter Jennings. She has also reported for Good Morning America and Nightline and has both co-anchored Early Morning News Now with Anderson Cooper and led the Consumer Unit for 20/20. Beginning in 2000, she led the Law and Justice Unit with Terry Moran and John Miller.

In February 2005, Floyd returned to Court TV (now truTV) to launch her own series, Jami Floyd: Best Defense, on which guests offered their legal analysis and spin on legal and political stories as well as coverage of major trials.

In 2010, when Court TV folded, she joined MSNBC as a legal and political analyst.

In 2012 she hosted TED Talks in NYC on NYC Media. In 2013 she joined the newly launching Al Jazeera America based in New York City and stayed with the network until shortly before its closure in 2016.

Journalism

On September 11, 2001, Floyd was dispatched by ABC News to cover the devastation at Ground Zero. Reflecting on her reporting in the days and weeks that followed for the 9/11 Tribute Center, Floyd later said, "As a journalist you make your decision you are going to fulfill your obligation to your viewers, readers, listeners... You cannot have a democracy without journalism."

In April 2005, Floyd caused a stir with comments she made to the LA Times about then-Court TV colleague Nancy Grace. Floyd expressed a concern in the LA Times that Grace presented a televised "rush to judgment" when she said, "I rarely agree with what comes out of her mouth, but it's hard not to like the person." Floyd, who returned to Court TV's midday programming in 2005 after nearly a decade at ABC News, went on to say, "We have a lot of guests who come on and mimic Nancy." In September 2005, Floyd elaborated on her comments about Grace in Elle, saying: "Nancy's appeal is not unlike Oprah's. Nancy is Everywoman, someone you could see at a mall, on the bus. She's not an elitist from Harvard. She is what any woman could become."

From 2010 to 2014, Floyd was a regular contributor to the WNYC.org website "It's a Free Country" and the PBS.org website "Need to Know," writing about politics, race, law and justice.

Since 2010, Floyd has co-hosted, with WNYC's Brian Lehrer, an annual Martin Luther King, Jr. Day celebration at the Apollo Theater. Together they conduct moderate panels, introduce live music performances, host spiritual leaders and engage in conversation with a full theater from Harlem on the topic of social justice and Dr. King's vision for America.

Retracted articles and resignation from WNYC  
In November 2021, 4 articles authored by Floyd that were published on the WNYC news site Gothamist between March and October 2021 were retracted for use of unattributed language from other publications. In a statement, Ms. Floyd acknowledged "mistakes," saying they were "never intentional or designed to deceive anyone."

In April 2022, Floyd was accused of plagiarism in 45 articles going back to 2010. She resigned from WNYC following the release of the report. She was told by WNYC management that the plagiarism was a fireable offense.

On February 9th, 2023, Floyd filed suit in federal court against WNYC and its parent company, New York Public Radio, for race discrimination, retaliation, and hostile work environment.

Awards and honors
Floyd and has won a Gracie Award, a Telly Award, and the National Association of Black Journalists Salute to Excellence Award and has been nominated twice for an Emmy Award.

Floyd has won more than a dozen awards, including the Gracie Award, and the RTNDA Unity Award and she has been nominated twice for an Emmy Award.

In August 2015, she was named a Public Scholar by the New York Council for the Humanities, for a two-year term, fall 2015 to fall 2017.

Personal life
Floyd married criminal defense and civil rights attorney Kurt Flehinger, and they have two children together.   In August 2005, Floyd moved to New York's Upper West Side, where the family has since resided.

References

External links
 
 
 Medium account

1964 births
American broadcast news analysts
American lawyers
American legal writers
American television reporters and correspondents
Al Jazeera people
Living people
Television anchors from Los Angeles
Television anchors from New York City
NBC News people
ABC News personalities
Binghamton University alumni
UC Berkeley School of Law alumni
Stanford Law School alumni
White House Fellows
American women lawyers
21st-century American women
People associated with Morrison & Foerster